The Pacific-10 Conference football season in 1998 ended with the UCLA Bruins winning the conference with an undefeated 8–0 conference record.

Awards and honors

Conference awards 
The following individuals won the conference's annual player and coach awards:
 Offensive Player of the Year: Cade McNown, QB, UCLA; Akili Smith, QB, Oregon
 Defensive Player of the Year: Chris Claiborne, ILB, USC
 Coach of the Year: Bob Toledo, UCLA

All-Conference teams 
The following players earned All-Pac-10 honors:
Offense

Defense

Specialists

References

External links 
 1998 Pacific-10 Conference Year Summary at Sports-Reference.com